Nemotelus uliginosus, the barred snout, is a Palearctic species of soldier fly.

Description
Length 5—5,5 mm.
Male: the abdomen is white with black spots. The cubital vein is forked. The venter is black with white incisures and a white spot. Female: the snout (rostellum) is long, the white spots above the antennae are linear and oblique, nearly meeting in the middle.<ref>Seguy. E. Faune de France Faune n° 13 1926. Diptères Brachycères.308 p., 685 fig.</ref>E. P. Narchuk in Bei-Bienko, G. Ya, 1988 Keys to the insects of the European Part of the USSR Volume 5 (Diptera) Part 2 English edition. Keys to Palaearctic species but now needs revision.

Biology
The habitat is saltmarsh, waste ground and unimproved grassland, usually coastal. Adults are found from June to early September, peaking in July. Adults feed on pollen and nectar including that of Alisma plantago-aquatica, Cirsium'', umbelliferae

Distribution
North, South USSR  Siberia, Kazakhstan. North and Central Europe, in north to middle Sweden and in South to northern France. North Africa

References

Stratiomyidae
Diptera of Europe
Diptera of Asia
Insects described in 1767
Taxa named by Carl Linnaeus